KYKD (100.1 FM) is a non-profit radio station airing a Christian radio format in Bethel, Alaska. The station is owned by Voice for Christ Ministries.

Translators
In addition to the main station, KYKD is relayed by an additional 6 translators to widen its broadcast area.

KYKD also provides programming to KSCM in Scammon Bay, owned by VisionAlaska, a non-profit organization who operates the station in partnership with Voice for Christ Ministries and the Scammon Bay Evangelical Covenant Church.

External links
 KYKD's Website
 
 

Moody Radio affiliate stations
Radio stations established in 1985
1985 establishments in Alaska
YKD
Bethel, Alaska